eHCF School of Medical Informatics is an Indian distance learning programme promoted by eHealth-Care Foundation, whose graduates receive a "Certificate in Medical Informatics".

Information
The course designed for general practitioners of Medicine (Doctors, Nurses, Paramedics) who want to utilize Information & Communication Technology  (ICT) in medicine. The course is a bridge between IT and Medicine. It starts with knowledge of basic computer and advances through the detailed learning in Medical Informatics. As per the institution website the course is easy to understand format with Tele-Medicine focus.

The Institution is getting admission applications from across the Globe.

References

External links
Health & Education Manual

Health informatics organizations
Distance education institutions based in India
Medical and health organisations based in India